Jan Nisar Akhtar  (18 February 1914 – 19 August 1976) was an Indian poet of Urdu ghazals and nazms, and a part of the Progressive Writers' Movement, who was also a lyricist for Bollywood.

He was son of Muztar Khairabadi and great grandson of Fazl-e-Haq Khairabadi his career spanned four decades during which he worked with music composers including C. Ramchandra, O.P. Nayyar, Datta Naik also credited as N. Datta and Khayyam and wrote 151 songs. Notable among them were songs from his breakthrough film, AR Kardar's Yasmin (1955), Aankhon hi Aankhon Mein in Guru Dutt's CID (1956), Yeh dil aur unki nigahon ke saaye in Prem Parbat (1974) and Aaja re in Noorie (1979) and his last song, Ae Dil-e-naadaan, in Kamal Amrohi's Razia Sultan (1983).

His poetry works include Nazr-e-Butaan, Salaasil, Javidaan, Pichali Pehar, Ghar Angan and Khaak-e-dil. The latter ("The Ashes of Heart") was a poetry collection for which he was awarded the 1976 Sahitya Akademi Award in Urdu by Sahitya Akademi, India's National Academy of Letters.

Early life

Jan Nisar passed his matriculation from Victoria Collegiate High School, Gwalior, and in 1930 joined Aligarh Muslim University, from where he gained his B.A. Honours and M.A. degrees. He started his doctoral work, but had to return to Gwalior due to family conditions.

Career

In 1949, he resigned from his job, moved to Bombay to write lyrics for Urdu/Hindi movies besides ghazals and nazms for general publication. Once in Bombay, he came in touch with other progressive writers, like Mulk Raj Anand, Krishan Chander, Rajinder Singh Bedi and Ismat Chugtai, who often met at Bombay's Silver Fish Restaurant, and subsequently came to be known as 'Bombay Group of Writers'. Success came his way quite late as a film lyricist, till then he was supported by his wife who had stayed back in Bhopal, though she died prematurely of cancer in 1953.  Finally he had a career breakthrough, with Yasmeen (1955), with music by C. Ramchandra. His association with Madan Mohan, the music director resulted in many memorable movie songs. Some of his notable lyrics were,  Meri Neendon Mein Tum in Naya Andaz (1956) by Kishore Kumar, Shamshad Begum, Garib Jan Key Hamko Naa Tum Daga Dena sung by Mohd. Rafi in Chhoo Mantar, the hit Piya piya piya... in Baap Re Baap (1955) music by O.P. Nayyar,  Aap Yun Faaslon Se by Lata Mangeshkar in Shankar Hussain (1977).

His poetry was secular and like many of progressive writers of his generation talked of freedom, dignity, economic exploitation and other issues gleaming of the leftist leanings. Even his romanticism which was amply displayed in his ghazals, was replete with references to household and family life. His notable books include Nazr-e-Butaan, Salaasil, Javidaan, Ghar Angan and Khaak-e-Dil (all Urdu titles). One of his many famous couplets is :

Ashaar mere yuu.N to zamaane ke liye hai.n,
kuchh sher faqat unako sunaane ke liye hai.n

Although my poems are meant for the whole world,
There are some couplets meant just for the beloved

He wrote and produced a film, Bahu Begum (1967), starring Pradeep Kumar and Meena Kumari. During the period of four-year to his death he published three collections of his works most important of them being, Khak-e-Dil (The Ashes of Heart"), which has his representative poems from 1935 to 1970, and which won him the Sahitya Akademi Award (Urdu) in 1976. Jan Nisar was commissioned by the first Prime Minister of India, Jawaharlal Nehru to collate the best Hindustani poetry of last 300 years, and later the first edition of the book titled Hindustan Hamara (Our Hindustan) in two volumes was released by Indira Gandhi. It contained Urdu verses on a topics, ranging from love and praise for India and its history, to festivals like Holi and Diwali, on Indian rivers like the Ganges, Yamuna and the Himalayas.

He died in Bombay on 19 August 1976, while he was still working on Kamal Amrohi's film, Razia Sultan  (1983). He was nominated posthumously for 1980 Filmfare Best Lyricist Award for "Aaja Re Mere Dilbar" from the film, Noorie.

His anthology, Hindustan Hamara was re-released in Hindi in 2006

Family
In 1943, he married Safia, sister of the poet Majaz. Safia worked as a school teacher at an Urdu-medium madarsa (Muslim school). She was meeting a practical necessity, to work outside her home, because Jan Nisar's income was at best sporadic, and it was necessary for her to work to support her children. Thus, when Jan Nisar moved to Mumbai to try his luck at earning a living as a film lyricist, Safia stayed back in Gwalior with their children, and wrote her absent husband a series of letters in Urdu. A collection of these letters, written between 1 October 1943 to 29 December 1953 penned, were first published in 1955 in two volumes under the title, "Harf-e-Aashna" and "Zer-e-Lab." Professor Asghar Wajahat, former Head of the Hindi Department, Jamia Millia Islamia, translated these letters into Hindi and this was published under the title "Tumhare Naam" in 2004.

Safia Akhtar died of cancer on 17 January 1953, less than ten years after her wedding, and left behind two very small sons. Jan Nisar left the children in the care of relatives while he pursued his hobbies of writing poetry and hobnobbing with various luminaries and socialites in Mumbai. Three years after Safia's death, Jan Nisar got married again on 17 September 1956, to Khadija Talat. His children by Safia did not have a good relationship with their step-mother, and his relations with them was likewise dysfunctional.

Filmography

Lyricist
 Baap Re Baap (1955)
 Yasmin (1955)
 CID (1956)
 Naya_Andaz (1956)
 Black Cat (1956)
 Rustom Sohrab (1963)
 Prem Parvat (1974)
 Shankar Hussain (1977)
 Noorie (1979)
 Razia Sultan (1983)

Producer
Bahu Begum  (1967)

Works
 Khamosh Awaz
 Khak-e-dil, Publisher: Nagara Tabaat, 1973.
 Hindustan Hamara, Volume 1 & 2. 1965, 1974.
 Pichhle Peher.
 GHAR AANGAN.
 Harf-e-ashna: Khatut (Letters)
 Ja-Nisar Akhxtar ki Shai'iri: Urdu Hindi me yakja, tr. by Amar Dihlavi. Publisher	Star, 1983.
 Kuliyat-e-Jan Nisar Akhtar. Publisher: Al-Muslim, 1992.
 Hamara Hindustan (anthology), Rajkamal Publications, 2006.
 Nigahon Ke Saaye, ed.  Vijay Akela, Rajkamal Publications, 2006. .

Further reading
 Jan Nisar Akhtar by Kishwar Sultan. Publisher: Nasim Book Depot, 1977.
 Intikhab-i Kalam: Majaz, Jazbi, Jan Nisar Akhtar, by Majaz. Sahitya Akademi Publications. .
 Tumhare Naam. Rajkamal Publications, 2004.
 Letters to Jan Nisar Akhtar by Sufiya Akhtar, 1949 Annual of Urdu Studies vol. 20 (2005).
A collection of verses by Jan Nisar Akhtar

References

 Lyrics by Jan Nisar Akhtar

External links
Exclusive innings, Biography at Screen

 Jan Nissar Akhtar Biography and works

1914 births
1976 deaths
Indian male poets
Urdu-language poets from India
Indian lyricists
Aligarh Muslim University alumni
People from Gwalior
Writers from Bhopal
Recipients of the Sahitya Akademi Award in Urdu
20th-century Indian poets
Poets from Madhya Pradesh
20th-century Indian male writers